Horseshoe Bend High School is a high school in New Site, Alabama.

References

External links
https://web.archive.org/web/20110820004244/http://www.tallapoosak12.org/education/school/school.php?sectionid=16

Public high schools in Alabama
Schools in Tallapoosa County, Alabama